The 2007 Weber Cup, took place from October 19 to 21 at the Barnsley Metrodome.

With the overall score standing at 4–3 to the Americans, there was everything to play for following the previous year's nail-biting epic which saw the destiny of the trophy decided in the final few frames of the deciding match.

The Europeans were once again skippered by Sweden's Tomas Leandersson who had opted for a Nordic influenced line-up which includes veteran Tore Torgersen of Norway, PBA star Mika Koivuniemi (Finland) playing in his second Weber Cup and 3-time EBT champion, Paul Moor (England). The new boy on the team was two-handed Finnish star Osku Palermaa, who at the time topped the EBT rankings.

For Team United States, Weber Cup stalwart Tim Mack again captained Team United States. He was joined by another Weber Cup veteran, Bill Hoffman and two of the PBA stars who helped secure the trophy in 2006, as Chris Barnes and Tommy Jones made their second appearances in the competition. The American debutant was PBA Player of the Year Doug Kent, and PBA Denny's World Championship titlist.

2007 Teams 

Team Europe (Left to Right)
  Tomas Leandersson (captain)
  Osku Palermaa
  Tore Torgersen
  Paul Moor
  Mika Koivuniemi

Team USA (Left to Right)
  Tommy Jones, Simpsonville, South Carolina
  Chris Barnes, Flower Mound, Texas
  Doug Kent, Newark, New Jersey
  Bill Hoffman Columbus, Ohio
  Tim Mack, Garfield, New Jersey (captain)

2007 results

Day 1, evening session 

Paul Moor once again opened for Team Europe, this time against Chris Barnes for Team USA. Moor and Barnes were never matched up in the 2006 tournament, and this was the first time they had gone head-to-head since Barnes beat Moor in the final of the 2006 World Tenpin Masters. Moor avenged this defeat with a comfortable 232–201 victory, to set Team Europe on their way. Barnes missed 2 single pins during the match.
Match 2 saw Mika Koivuniemi up against Team USA Captain Tim Mack. Koivuniemi started with the first 7 strikes, and won 267–240, to put Team Europe 2-0 ahead.
Team Europe debutant Osku Palermaa was able to stretch the lead even further, with a 237–206 win over Weber Cup veteran Bill Hoffman.
Match 4 brought together Tore Torgersen and Team USA's debutant Doug Kent. The match went right to the wire, with Kent edging it 264–258 to gain Team USA's first point.
Tommy Jones was then able to narrow the gap further, rolling only the 2nd ever perfect game in Weber Cup History. Jones opponent, Tomas Leandersson managed just 204, but was able to finish with 4 strikes in a row.
The final match of the session was the team baker game. Historically this has been a strong game for Team USA, and they were able to level the tournament at 3-3, winning the match 234–215, snatching it at the end with Tommy Jones rolling 3 strikes in the 10th frame, taking his total to 16 strikes from a possible 16.

Day 2, afternoon session 

The afternoon session was made up of 3 doubles, 2 singles and 1 baker team match to finish. Up first for Team Europe were Paul Moor and Tore Torgersen, against Bill Hoffman and Doug Kent. The European pair ran out winners 236–215. Chris Barnes brought the overall score level at 4–4 with a 239-227 singles victory over Osku Palermaa. Barnes needed to spare to win in the 10th, and despite leaving a tricky 4 pins after his first ball, was able to convert the spare to win.
Team USA captain Tim Mack, together with Tommy Jones, put the Americans in front overall for the first time, with a 226–207 win over Team Europe's captain Tomas Leandersson and Mika Koivuniemi. This lead was extended by Doug Kent who was victorious over Mika Koivuniemi in the next match, in a close-fought singles, Kent won 212–208.
The final doubles game of the day saw the current EBT number 1 and 2, Osku Palermaa and Paul Moor up against Tommy Jones and Chris Barnes. Jones and Barnes put together one of the highest doubles scores ever recorded in the Weber Cup, and won comfortably 279–231. The final match of the afternoon was the baker team game, which was won by Team Europe 214–210. Team USA anchorman Tommy Jones needed 2 strikes and at least 3 pins with the 3rd ball to win, but after his first strike, was denied with the second.

Day 2, evening session 

The evening session took the same format as the evening session on the first day, with 5 singles matches and a baker team game. First onto the lanes was Mika Koivuniemi and Bill Hoffman. Koivuniemi bowled 11 strikes out of a possible 12, to which Hoffman could not reply, losing 279–207. There was A similar scenario in the second match, but with the opposite result as Chris Barnes rolled 11 strikes against Paul Moor to win 290–203.
The two team captains were matched up next, with Tomas Leandersson edging past Tim Mack 223–220. Needing just 8 pins with his first ball in the 10th frame to win, Leandersson duly obliged, however he left a split, which he was then unable to convert. Tore Torgersen avenged his first day defeat to Doug Kent, winning 234–208. Kent was left needing two strikes in the 10th frame to win, but only rolled a 7 with his first ball, handing the match to Torgersen.
Another close fought singles followed, with Tommy Jones victorious over Osku Palermaa 212–204. In the 7th frame both bowlers left the difficult 2-8-10 split, which Palermaa was able to convert with his two-handed 'backup' delivery. However needing two strikes and 9 pins in the 10th frame to win, Palermaa only managed the first strike, failing with the second, despite throwing a good shot. Onto the final match of the day, and Team Europe were able to win the session, bringing the overall score level at 9-9, with a hard-fought 212–188 win in the baker team game.

Day 3, afternoon session

Day 3, evening session

Results table

Past events 
 2007 Weber Cup - Team USA Win, Barnsley Metrodome.
 2006 Weber Cup - Team USA Win, Barnsley Metrodome.
 2005 Weber Cup  - Team Europe win, Barnsley Metrodome.
 2004 Weber Cup  - Team Europe win, Altrincham Leisure Centre, Greater Manchester, England.
 2003 Weber Cup - Team Europe win, Altrincham Leisure Centre, Greater Manchester, England.
 2002 Weber Cup - Team USA win, Ponds Forge International Center, Sheffield, England.
 2001 Weber Cup - Team USA win, Goresbrook Leisure Centre, Dagenham, England
 2000 Weber Cup - Team USA win, Inaugural event in Warsaw, Poland.

Similar events in other sports 
 Ryder Cup — Men's golf
 Solheim Cup — Women's golf
 Mosconi Cup — Nine-ball pool
 Continental Cup of Curling — Curling
 IAAF World Cup — Athletics
 NFL Global Junior Championship — American Football, includes a Team Europe

External links 
 Official website of the Weber Cup
 https://web.archive.org/web/20060205054259/http://www.btba.org.uk/weber.htm
 https://web.archive.org/web/20080901181122/http://www.bowlersjournal.com/tournaments/
 Bowlinglinks all over the World, sorted by categories

Ten-pin bowling competitions in the United Kingdom
2007 in bowling